Fayette is a bus rapid transit station in Alexandria, Virginia. It is located in the mixed-traffic portion of the Metroway bus rapid transit line providing two-way service along the route. The station provides service to the North Ridge community in Alexandria.

History 
Fayette was going to be one of three Metroway stations opening in 2016. It did not open until September of the following year.

References

External links
 Official Metroway site

Buildings and structures in Alexandria, Virginia
Metroway
Bus stations in Virginia
2017 establishments in Virginia
Transport infrastructure completed in 2017